Pravin Kalyan Amre (born 14 August 1968) is an Indian cricketer who represented the Indian cricket team between 1991 and 1999. He played 11 Test matches and 37 One Day Internationals (ODIs).

Domestic career
At the domestic level, Amre played for various teams such as Mumbai, Railways, Rajasthan and Bengal, while also playing in South Africa for Boland. His score of 246 for Rest of India against Bengal remains the highest score by any batsman in the Irani Trophy. His coach, Ramakant Achrekar, who was also the coach of Sachin Tendulkar, had once famously claimed that he would be a better batsman than even Sachin.

International career
Amre made his One Day International (ODI) debut against South Africa at Kolkata on 10 November 1991, scoring a 55 off 74 balls. His Test debut came against the same team at Durban, scoring a century which was incidentally his highest score in tests. In the event, he became the ninth India player to achieve this feat. Pravin Amre's highest ODI score also came against South Africa when he scored an unbeaten 84 from 98 balls to lead India to victory in the 7th one day of the 1992 ODI series.

After cricket
Amre was coached by Ramakant Achrekar, who also trained cricketers like Sachin Tendulkar and Vinod Kambli. He was the coach of the India Under-19 Cricket Team, which won the 2012 Under-19 Cricket World Cup in Australia and Mumbai cricket team. He was the assistant coach of Pune Warriors India in the Indian Premier League. He was the talent scout for the Delhi Capitals in the IPL.

In July 2019, he was appointed as the batting coach of the United States National Cricket Team on a short-term basis.

In January 2021, he was appointed as the assistant coach of the Delhi Capitals.

References

External links 
 

1968 births
Bengal cricketers
Boland cricketers
India One Day International cricketers
India Test cricketers
Cricketers who made a century on Test debut
Indian cricketers
Living people
Mumbai cricketers
Railways cricketers
Rajasthan cricketers
East Zone cricketers
Goa cricketers
Central Zone cricketers
Cricketers from Mumbai
Indian Premier League coaches
Indian cricket coaches
Cricketers at the 1992 Cricket World Cup